The 2016 CS Ondrej Nepela Memorial was held on September and October 2016. It is an annual senior international figure skating competition held in Bratislava, Slovakia. It was part of the 2016–17 ISU Challenger Series. Medals were awarded in the disciplines of men's singles, ladies' singles, pair skating, and ice dancing.

The competition returned to the name Ondrej Nepela Memorial after three years as the Ondrej Nepela Trophy. The committee which organized the event in the previous seven years and which has a trademark on Ondrej Nepela Trophy was suspended by the Slovak Figure Skating Association and replaced by another organizing team.

Entries
The International Skating Union published the full preliminary list of entries on 12 September 2016.

Withdrew before starting orders drawn
 Men: Krzysztof Gała (POL), Ondrej Spiegl (SWE)
 Ladies: Kristen Spours (GBR), Alexandra Hagarová (SVK), Nina Letenayová (SVK)
 Pairs: Aliona Savchenko / Bruno Massot (GER)
 Ice dance: Adelina Galayavieva / Laurent Abecassis (FRA), Carter Marie Jones / Richard Sharpe (GBR), Carolina Moscheni / Ádám Lukács (HUN)

Added
 Ladies: Ivett Tóth (HUN), Micol Cristini (ITA)

Results

Men

Ladies

Pairs

Ice dancing

References

External links
 
 24th Ondrej Nepela Memorial at the International Skating Union
 Ondrej Nepela Memorial at the Slovak Figure Skating Association

CS Ondrej Nepela
2016 in Slovak sport